Avoid may refer to:

Music
 Avoid note, in jazz
 Voidable, in law
 "Avoid", a song by Lil Peep, featuring Wicca Phase Springs Eternal and Døves

See also
 
 
 A Void, translation of a novel by Georges Perec
 Void (disambiguation)
 Bypass (disambiguation)
 Circumnavigation